Gardnerville is an unincorporated town in Douglas County, Nevada, adjacent to the county seat of Minden. The population was 6,211 at the time of the 2020 Census.

U.S. Route 395 runs through the center of Gardnerville. State Route 207, known as Kingsbury Grade, connects Gardnerville to Stateline and U.S. Route 50.

History
The community was named after John Gardner, a local cattleman.

It was a sundown town; a whistle would be blown at 6 p.m. daily alerting Native Americans to leave by sundown.

Geography

Climate
The area has a Köppen Climate Classification of Csb, which is a dry-summer subtropical climate often referred to as "Mediterranean".

Demographics

As of the census of 2000, there were 3,357 people, 1,473 households, and 870 families residing in the CDP. The racial makeup of the CDP was 89.93% White, 0.45% African American, 1.07% Native American, 1.28% Asian, 0.09% Pacific Islander, 5.30% from other races, and 1.88% from two or more races. Hispanic or Latino of any race were 11.83% of the population.

There were 1,473 households, out of which 28.6% had children under the age of 18 living with them, 43.2% were married couples living together, 11.5% had a female householder with no husband present, and 40.9% were non-families. 33.1% of all households were made up of individuals, and 13.5% had someone living alone who was 65 years of age or older. The average household size was 2.21 and the average family size was 2.82.

The population is relatively evenly distributed by age, with 22.6% under the age of 18, 7.5% from 18 to 24, 28.3% from 25 to 44, 21.1% from 45 to 64, and 20.4% who were 65 years of age or older. The median age was 39 years. For every 100 females, there were 93.0 males. For every 100 females age 18 and over, there were 87.6 males.

The median income for a household in the CDP was $41,204, and the median income for a family was $46,154. Males had a median income of $34,769 versus $29,550 for females. The per capita income for the CDP was $20,670. About 12.1% of families and 15.1% of the population were below the poverty line, including 23.1% of those under age 18 and 13.6% of those age 65 or over.

Media 
 Carson Valley Times
 The Record-Courier

Notable people
 Jill Derby, Nevada System of Higher Education regent
 Shawn Estes, Major League Baseball pitcher

In popular culture 
 1989 : The Wizard, directed by Todd Holland, starring Fred Savage 
 1957 : Wild is the Wind, directed by George Cukor
 1948 : Chicken Every Sunday, directed by George Seaton
 2012 : The Motel Life, directed by Alan and Gabriel Polsky, starring Emile Hirsch, Stephen Dorff, and Dakota Fanning
 1973 : Charley Varrick, directed by Don Siegel, starring Walter Matthau, Joe Don Baker, Sheree North, and Andrew Robinson

References

External links

 Carson Valley Chamber of Commerce
 Gardnerville Business Community Website

Census-designated places in Douglas County, Nevada
Census-designated places in Nevada
Unincorporated towns in Nevada
Sundown towns in Nevada